The 2009 U.S. Men's Clay Court Championships is a men's tennis tournament played on outdoor clay courts. It is the 41st edition of the U.S. Men's Clay Court Championships, and is an ATP World Tour 250 event. It takes place at River Oaks Country Club in Houston, Texas, United States, from April 6 through April 12, 2009. Unseeded Lleyton Hewitt won the singles title.

Finals

Singles

 Lleyton Hewitt defeated  Wayne Odesnik 6–2, 7–5
 It was Hewitt's 1st singles title of the year (after a break of 2 years) and the 27th of his career.

Doubles

 Bob Bryan /  Mike Bryan defeated  Jesse Levine /  Ryan Sweeting 6–1, 6–2

References

External links
Official website
Singles draw
Qualifying Singles draw

 
U.S. Men's Clay Court Championships
U.S. Men's Clay Court Championships
U.S. Men's Clay Court Championships
U.S. Men's Clay Court Championships
U.S. Men's Clay Court Championships